Semir Štilić (born 8 October 1987) is a Bosnian professional footballer who plays as an attacking midfielder for Bosnian Premier League club Željezničar.

He also played for the Bosnia and Herzegovina national team.

Club career

Early career
Born in Sarajevo, Štilić began his playing career with hometown club Željezničar in 2005. After three seasons with Željezničar, he moved abroad for the first time in his career, signing a 4-year contract with Polish club Lech Poznań in June 2008.

On 23 July 2012, Štilić joined Karpaty Lviv, He stayed in Ukraine for only one season, as he left for Turkish club Gaziantepspor in August 2013.

On 23 January 2014, Štilić went back to Poland and signed one-and-a-half-year deal with Wisła Kraków.

APOEL
On 13 June 2015, Štilić signed a three-year contract with Cypriot First Division club APOEL. He made his APOEL debut on 21 July 2015, in his team's 1–1 away draw against Vardar in the second qualifying round of the UEFA Champions League. He scored his first goal for APOEL on 22 August 2015, in his team's 5–1 away victory over Ermis Aradippou in a league match. On 26 August 2015, Štilić scored from a long-range free kick against Astana at the GSP Stadium, in APOEL's 1–1 draw in the play-off round of the 2015–16 UEFA Champions League.

On 19 September 2016, his contract with APOEL was mutually terminated.

Wisła Płock
On 4 September 2017, Štilić moved from Wisła Kraków to Ekstraklasa club Wisła Płock. In May 2019, almost two years after signing with Wisła Płock, he decided to leave the club.

Return to Željezničar
On 2 August 2019, eleven years after leaving the club, Štilić returned to and signed a three-year contract with Željezničar. His first match for Željezničar after eleven years was a thrilling 5–2 home league match, Sarajevo derby win against Sarajevo on 31 August 2019. Štilić scored his first goal since his return to Željezničar on 25 September 2019, in a 6–0 home league win against Zvijezda 09. He was named man of the match in Željezničar's 1–3 away league win against Sarajevo in the city derby on 30 November 2019, scoring two goals and earning an assist.

Štilić scored his first goal for the club in the 2020–21 season on 7 August 2020 in a league win against Radnik Bijeljina. He scored his first goal of the 2021–22 season against Posušje on 3 April 2022.

International career
 

Štilić represented the Bosnia and Herzegovina U21 national team eight times, scoring one goal. On 15 December 2007, he represented the Bosnia and Herzegovina Olympic team, coming on as an 89th-minute substitute in Bosnia's 0–1 friendly defeat against Poland.

He made his senior international debut for Bosnia and Herzegovina on 30 January 2008, in a friendly match against Japan, coming on as an 83rd-minute substitute in 0–3 away defeat.

Personal life
Semir is the son of the former footballer and current football manager Ismet Štilić.

Career statistics

Club

1 One appearance in Ekstraklasa Cup.2 One appearance in Polish SuperCup.3 One appearance in Cypriot Super Cup.

International

Honours
Lech Poznań
Ekstraklasa: 2009–10
Polish Cup: 2008–09
Polish SuperCup: 2010

APOEL 
Cypriot First Division: 2015–16

References

External links

1987 births
Living people
Footballers from Sarajevo
Bosnia and Herzegovina footballers
Bosnia and Herzegovina international footballers
Bosnia and Herzegovina under-21 international footballers
Bosnia and Herzegovina expatriate footballers
Association football midfielders
Premier League of Bosnia and Herzegovina players
Ekstraklasa players
Ukrainian Premier League players
Süper Lig players
Cypriot First Division players
FK Željezničar Sarajevo players
Lech Poznań players
FC Karpaty Lviv players
Wisła Kraków players
Gaziantepspor footballers
APOEL FC players
Wisła Płock players
Expatriate footballers in Poland
Expatriate footballers in Ukraine
Expatriate footballers in Turkey
Expatriate footballers in Cyprus
Bosnia and Herzegovina expatriate sportspeople in Poland
Bosnia and Herzegovina expatriate sportspeople in Ukraine
Bosnia and Herzegovina expatriate sportspeople in Turkey
Bosnia and Herzegovina expatriate sportspeople in Cyprus